The Bonnet Carré Spillway  is a flood control operation in the Lower Mississippi Valley. The spillway was constructed between 1929 and 1931, following the Great Mississippi Flood of 1927, and has been designated as a National Historic Civil Engineering Landmark by the American Society of Civil Engineers.

Bonnet Carré Crevasse
The Bonnet Carré Crevasse was one of several levee breaches in the Bonnet Carré area in 1871.  Local drainage systems were unable to contain the floodwater and strong winds caused the water to enter Lake Pontchartrain and surrounding urban areas. The river levee was not restored until 1883.

Overview

The Bonnet Carré Spillway consists of two basic components: a control structure along the east bank of the Mississippi River and a floodway that transfers the diverted flood waters to the lake. The control structure, located between the towns of Montz and Norco, is a mechanically-controlled concrete weir that extends for over a mile and a half parallel to the river. When opened, the control structure allows overflow volume to flow into Lake Pontchartrain. The lake's opening to the gulf is sufficient to absorb and dissipate any conceivable volume of flood flow. Thus, the flood surcharge portion of the water from the Mississippi is divided between the main river and the diversion channel, with the surcharge bypassing the New Orleans metropolitan area, resulting in the Mississippi being lower (through that area) than it could have been and reducing the stress on the area's levees that line the river. The spillway is crossed by U.S. 61 and Interstate 10.

The spillway was built in response to the Great Mississippi Flood of 1927 that inundated much of the Mississippi River basin. It was first opened during the flood of 1937, and twelve times thereafter through February 2019 to lower river stages at New Orleans. The 2019 opening began February 27, 2019, when river levels were predicted to rise to minor flood stage in New Orleans on March 19, 2019. The Army Corps of Engineers initially opened 38 of the 350 bays and increased this number to 206 bays when the flood crest arrived later in March. The Army Corps of Engineers closed the spillway on April 11, 2019, only to reopen it again on May 10, 2019.  This marks the first time in the spillway's history that it was opened twice in one year. In April 2020 the Spillway was again opened from April 3, 2020, until May 1, 2020, a total of 29 days.

Structure & multi-state plan

The floodgate inlet is offset into the Mississippi River bank, at a location that had seen natural flooding for at least two centuries. The concrete structure has been designed to reduce settling into the riverbank. The opening and closing of the spillway is done by lifting out up to 7000 wooden 'needles' (8" x 12" wooden beams) arranged in 350 linear bays. This is done by two rail-mounted gantry cranes atop the spillway. The number of needles removed determines the water flow into the spillway. Gaps built into each bay allow limited seepage anytime the river level reaches the bottom of the bays. Removal of all 7000 needles takes about 36 hours but is usually done over a period of several days.

The spillway is part of the United States Army Corps of Engineers' multi-state plan, called the Mississippi River and Tributaries Project (MR&T), providing flood protection for the alluvial valley between Cape Girardeau, Missouri. and the mouth of the river near Venice, Louisiana. Because of the wide expanse of the project and the complex problems involved, the plan contains an array of features. The MR&T Project provides for levees to contain flood flows, floodways such as the Bonnet Carré to redirect excess flows away from the Mississippi, and other aspects such as channel improvement and river bank stabilization, for efficient navigation and protection of the levee system. It also involves reservoirs and pumping stations for flood control drainage.

History of openings

The following chart shows the years when the spillway was opened, number of days it remained open, peak number of bays opened, percent of bays opened, and ideal flow capacity. Ideal flow capacity is calculated by ideal rate of flow for each bay multiplied by number of bays opened; remember that the spillway has a design capacity of 250,000 cu ft/s and there are 350 bays, making the ideal rate of flow for each bay 714.3 cu ft/s.

Kugler and Kenner Cemeteries

There are two cemeteries located in the spillway. The cemeteries contain the remains of enslaved persons of African descent and free African-Americans, and the historic ground surface is under several feet of sediment. When the spillway gates are opened, the cemeteries are flooded.
  
The location of the gravesites was a mystery until May 1975, when the US Army Corps of Engineers excavated a ditch in the spillway. During that process, a tombstone and casket were discovered. In 1986, the corps ordered a historical study of the spillway and discovered a second cemetery. The two cemeteries were placed on the National Register of Historic Places in 1987. The artifacts discovered during the 1986 study included coffin furniture, coffins, grave markers, cultural remains, and human remains. The archaeological district consists of the two cemeteries. Additional research on the cemeteries was done in 2002–2005 and archaeological investigations in 2008–2009.

The cemeteries, named the Kenner Cemetery and the Kugler Cemetery, are black burial plots which appear to date from the early 1800s and were in use until 1929. Several African-American US Army Civil War veterans were moved from the spillway cemeteries to Chalmette National Cemetery in 1930. The total number of burials in either cemetery is unknown. The sites adjoin 19th- and early 20th-century sugar plantations in St. Charles Parish. According to oral histories and as confirmed by GIS analysis, both cemeteries were located in the midst of the cane fields of their respective plantations. The Kenner Cemetery, located on the former Roseland Plantation, was reported to be marked by iron and wooden crosses during its period of use. No such markers were confirmed archaeologically, but one granite US veteran headstone was recovered from the site. The Kugler Cemetery, located on the former Hermitage Plantation, was reported to contain iron crosses and a metal fence. One such iron cross and remnants of what could have been the fence were recovered during the 1986 archaeological investigations. At present, the cemetery sites have been demarcated by young live oak trees.

Natural resource management

In 2007, extraction operations began on a  square section of spillway property. The  spillway, designed to divert rising water out of the Mississippi River during flooding seasons, long has been a major source of sand and clay that is used in construction projects throughout the area. But in the post-Katrina era, clay extracted from the spillway will be crucial to raising the levees in St. Charles Parish and east Jefferson Parish.

The spillway's secondary function is as a recreational area. It is used for off-road vehicles, biking, boating, hiking, hunting, and fishing. It is designated a protected wildlife management area by the Louisiana Department of Wildlife and Fisheries. To enhance fishing in the spillway, the clay extraction pits were filled with water and stocked with bluegill, largemouth bass, and other fish.

Diversion projects

The success of the Caernarvon Freshwater and the Davis Pond Freshwater Diversions, especially concerning wetlands maintenance more than wetlands building, has led to studies for more fresh water diversion projects. Caernarvon and Davis Pond diversions have limits, because of laws governing their operation, aimed at limiting the flow of freshwater to minimize damage to oysters. The Bonnet Carré Spillway diversion would be built within the spillway, on the east bank of the Mississippi, allowing up to 25,000 c.f.s. (i.e. ft3/s) of fresh water and sediment diversion into Lake Pontchartrain and the Mississippi Sound. The diversion would slow or stop subsidence, reducing marsh loss by 10,500 acres in the next 50 years, providing fish and wildlife protection, as well as further storm surge protection. The diversion was authorized by the Water Resources Development Act of 1988 (WRDA 1988), and Congress (1990) split the cost and maintenance between the Federal Government at 75%, Louisiana at 20% and Mississippi at 5%. Louisiana and Mississippi must agree to a final project design, but in July 1996, Louisiana withdrew as a sponsor, and as of 2016 an agreement has not been reached.

Marine fisheries damage

The several openings of the spillway have had a significant effect on marine fisheries in the Mississippi Sound, which resulted in a federal award of damages in 2011 and ongoing federal litigation over the management of the spillway.

See also
CNR Bonnet Carré Spillway-Baton Rouge Bridge
CNR Bonnet Carré Spillway-McComb Bridge
Kansas City Southern Bonnet Carré Spillway Bridge
I-10 Bonnet Carré Spillway Bridge
U.S. 61 Bonnet Carré Spillway Bridge
Birds Point-New Madrid Floodway
Morganza Spillway
2011 Mississippi River floods

References

External links

 U.S. Army Corps of Engineers Bonnet Carré Spillway Official Site
 "New Orleans Flood Valve Finished", March 1931, Popular Science

Mississippi River
United States Army Corps of Engineers
Buildings and structures in St. Charles Parish, Louisiana
Protected areas of St. Charles Parish, Louisiana
Tributaries of Lake Pontchartrain
Tourist attractions in St. Charles Parish, Louisiana
Landforms of St. Charles Parish, Louisiana
1931 establishments in Louisiana
Historic Civil Engineering Landmarks
Spillways